The second government of Susana Díaz was formed on 18 June 2015 following the latter's reelection as President of Andalusia by the Parliament of Andalusia on 11 June and her swearing-in on 14 June, as a result of the Socialist Party of Andalusia (PSOE-A) emerging as the largest parliamentary force at the 2015 Andalusian regional election.

The cabinet comprised members of the PSOE–A and a number of independents. It was automatically dismissed on 3 December 2018 as a consequence of the 2018 regional election, but remained in acting capacity until the next government was sworn in.

Investiture

Council of Government
The Council of Government was structured into the offices for the president, the vice president and 13 ministries.

Notes

References

2015 establishments in Andalusia
2019 disestablishments in Andalusia
Cabinets established in 2015
Cabinets disestablished in 2019
Cabinets of Andalusia